James Given Tavern, also known as Two Mile House, is a historic inn and tavern located at South Middleton Township in Cumberland County, Pennsylvania. The original section was built in 1820. It consists of a 2 1/2-story, five bay wide limestone main block with a two-story, two bay rear kitchen ell, and 1 1/2-story stone addition built in the 1920s. It has a Federal style interior.  A portico with Doric order columns was built about 1840.  The portico was originally on the Lamberton House in Carlisle, Pennsylvania.  It housed a tavern until 1857.

It was listed on the National Register of Historic Places in 1992.

References 

Commercial buildings on the National Register of Historic Places in Pennsylvania
Federal architecture in Pennsylvania
Commercial buildings completed in 1820
Buildings and structures in Cumberland County, Pennsylvania
Drinking establishments on the National Register of Historic Places in Pennsylvania
National Register of Historic Places in Cumberland County, Pennsylvania